For the Summer Olympics, there are 25 venues that have been or will be used for weightlifting.

References

Olympic weightlifting venues
Weight
Venues
Weightlifting-related lists